Red rice may refer to:

 Red rice, varieties of rice that are red in color
Spanish rice, a dish that may become red in color
 Charleston red rice, a dish in the American states of South Carolina and Georgia
 Red Rice (album), a 1998 album by Eliza Carthy
 Red Rice, Hampshire, a small hamlet just south-west of Andover, Hampshire, England